Paris buns are a sweetened breadlike cake similar to scones. A recipe from an 1881 cookbook refers to Paris buns as "Scotch" and says that three of the buns cost a penny.

In popular culture
 John Dufresne included the story 'Lemonade & Paris Buns' in his 2005 short story collection Johnny Too Bad.
 Van Morrison mentions Paris buns in the song 'Cleaning Windows' from his 1982 album Beautiful Vision.

References

External links

Sweet breads
Scottish cuisine